Gyatso is the final studio album by industrial punk jazz band 16-17, released on May 10, 1994 by Pathological Records and Big Cat Records, re-released by Savage Land 2008.

Reception

AllMusic staff writer William York calls Gyatso a "a take-no-prisoners piece of industrial hardcore jazz".

Track listing
All tracks composed by Alex Buess, Markus Kneubuehler and Knut Remond (16-17)

Personnel
Adapted from the Gyatso liner notes.

16-17
Alex Buess – saxophones, bassclarinet, electronics
Knut Remond – drums, percussion
Markus Kneubühler – guitar, synths
Additional musicians and production
Kevin Martin – production, samples
G.C.Green – bass
Tony Cousins – mastering (1993)
Weasel Walter – mastering (2008)
The Pathological Puppy – front cover design
The RGB Design – layout
Jon Wakelin – engineering
Manuel Liebeskind – engineering
Jason Pettigrew – liner notes

Release history

References

External links 
 

1994 albums
Big Cat Records albums
16-17 albums